"Tyrone" is a song recorded by American singer Erykah Badu during a concert in 1997. It was released as the lead single from her live album Live (1997) on October 27, 1997, by Kedar Records and Universal Records.

Released for airplay only, "Tyrone" was a moderate commercial success, peaking at number 62 on the US Radio Songs. However, it became Badu's third number-one single on the US R&B/Hip-Hop Airplay.

Accolades

Commercial performance
"Tyrone" did not receive a commercial release in the United States, hence it was ineligible to enter the US Billboard Hot 100, as Billboards rules at the time did not allow airplay-only songs to enter the main charts. It peaked at number 62 on the US Radio Songs, spending five weeks on the chart. It fared better on the urban charts, peaking atop the R&B/Hip-Hop Airplay and becoming her third number-one on the chart. The song debuted at number 39 on the Rhythmic Top 40, peaking at number 24 in its third week and spending a total of six weeks on the chart. Internationally, "Tyrone" charted only in the Netherlands, where it debuted at number 95 on the Dutch Single Top 100 and peaked at number 19 in its sixth week, charting for a total of 15 weeks.

Music video
The accompanying music video for "Tyrone" shows Badu performing the song live.

Legacy
Since its release, "Tyrone" has been referenced in other media, most notably in the film Next Friday (2000), when the character Tyrone is making a fake call at a restaurant. The song's title was also referenced by Beyoncé in her song "Kitty Kat" (2006) and in the rap of 3LW's single "No More (Baby I'ma Do Right)" (2000), as well as by R. Kelly in the song "When a Woman's Fed Up" (1998). The song was covered by American rock band My Morning Jacket on their compilation album Early Recordings (2004).

Track listings and formats
US 7-inch vinyl
 "Tyrone" (clean live version) – 4:40
 "On & On" – 3:47

European CD single
 "Tyrone" (live album version) – 3:56
 "Tyrone" (extended version) – 5:40

European maxi CD single
 "Tyrone" (live album version) – 3:56
 "Tyrone" (clean version) – 3:00
 "Tyrone" (extended clean version) – 5:40
 "Tyrone" (instrumental) – 5:40

Credits and personnel
Credits adapted from AllMusic.
Erykah Badu – creation, mixing, primary artist, production, vocals
Poogie Bell – drums
Karen Bernod – backing vocals
Tom Coyne – mastering
Hubert Eaves IV – bass
Norman "Keys" Hurt	– creation, keyboards, mixing, producer
Gorden Mack – mixing
Kedar Massenburg – executive producer
N'Dambi – backing vocals
Kenny Ortíz – engineering, mixing
Joyce M. Strong – backing vocals

Charts

Release history

References

1997 singles
Erykah Badu songs
Songs written by Erykah Badu
Live singles
1997 songs